The Two-woman bobsleigh event in the IBSF World Championships 2016 was held on 12–13 February 2016.

Results
The first two runs were started at 16:45 on 12 February 2016 and the last two runs at 15:00 on 13 February 2016.

References

Two-woman